Sipilou Department is a department of Tonkpi Region in Montagnes District, Ivory Coast. In 2021, its population was 73,109 and its seat is the settlement of Sipilou. The sub-prefectures of the department are Sipilou and Yorodougou.

History
Sipilou Department was created in 2012 by dividing Biankouma Department.

Notes

Departments of Tonkpi
States and territories established in 2012
2012 establishments in Ivory Coast